Anders Oscar Ahlgren (12 February 1888 – 27 December 1976) was a Swedish Greco-Roman wrestler. He was a world champion in 1913 and finished second in 1911 and 1922.

At the 1912 Summer Olympics, Ahlgren won the silver medal in the light heavyweight class. In a remarkable final, he wrestled for nine hours against Ivar Böhling, before the bout was declared a draw. The judges refused to award a gold medal, and gave silver medals to both wrestlers.

Ahlgren was coached by Iivari Tuomisto, a Finnish heavyweight wrestler.

Besides wrestling Ahlgren was involved in the production of canned food and co-owned a mink farm.

References

External links

 
 

1888 births
1976 deaths
Sportspeople from Malmö
Wrestlers at the 1912 Summer Olympics
Wrestlers at the 1920 Summer Olympics
Swedish male sport wrestlers
Olympic wrestlers of Sweden
Olympic silver medalists for Sweden
Olympic medalists in wrestling
Medalists at the 1912 Summer Olympics
World Wrestling Championships medalists
World Wrestling Champions